Roehampton was built in Sunderland on 5 May 1852. She sailed to India and Australia, and carried immigrants to New Zealand. She foundered on 3 March 1859 while participating in the guano trade from Peru.

Career
Roehampton was registered in Newcastle. She first appeared in Lloyd's Register (LR) in 1852.

Adelaide: Roehampton sailed from Calcutta on 2 February 1853 and arrived at Adelaide on 2 April. She sailed from Adelaide for Calcutta on 11 May.

New Zealand: Roehampton, Candler, master, sailed from London on 5 November 1857, bound for New Zealand with 112 migrants. She arrived at Lyttelton on 7 March 1858 and Port Chalmers on 3 April. She sailed from Otago on 18 April, bound for Guam, in ballast.

Fate
Roehampton foundered in the Pacific Ocean on 3 March 1859. Her crew survived. She was on a voyage from Callao to the Chincha Islands, of the coast of Peru. The Chincha Islands were noted for their guano deposits.

In 1859, 118 ships left Peru with guano; four of these were lost. Anthony Gibes & Co. lost three. One of these was Roehampton.

Citations

References
 Royal Commission on Unseaworthy Ships (1873) Preliminary Report ...: Minutes of the Evidence, and Appendix

1852 ships
Age of Sail merchant ships of England
Migrant ships to New Zealand
Maritime incidents in March 1859